Delatite was an electoral district of the Legislative Assembly in the Australian state of Victoria from 1877 to 1889. It was located in north-east Victoria and included the districts of Greta, Mansfield, Rothesay, Oxley, Strathbogie, Warrenbayne and Whorouly.

Delatite was abolished in 1904 and substantially replaced by the Electoral district of Upper Goulburn the same year.

Members

References

Former electoral districts of Victoria (Australia)
1877 establishments in Australia
1904 disestablishments in Australia